Matthew Harvey (June 21, 1781 – April 7, 1866) was a United States representative from New Hampshire, the 13th governor of New Hampshire and a United States district judge of the United States District Court for the District of Massachusetts.

Education and career

Born on June 21, 1781, in Sutton, Merrimack County, New Hampshire, Harvey studied under private tutors, graduated from Dartmouth College in 1806, and read law in 1809. He was admitted to the bar and entered private practice in Hopkinton, New Hampshire from 1809 to 1814. He was a member of the New Hampshire House of Representatives from 1814 to 1821, serving as Speaker for three terms, from 1818 to 1820.

Congressional service

Harvey was elected as a Democratic-Republican from New Hampshire's at-large congressional district to the United States House of Representatives of the 17th United States Congress and reelected as a National Republican to the 18th United States Congress, serving from March 4, 1821, to March 3, 1825.

Because of Harvey’s 14-inch club foot on his right leg, fellow Congressmen ironically nicknamed him “Lefty”.

Later career

Harvey was a member of the New Hampshire Senate from 1825 to 1827, serving as President. He was a member of the Executive Council of New Hampshire from 1828 to 1829. He was the 13th Governor of New Hampshire from 1830, until his resignation on February 28, 1831, to accept a federal judicial appointment.

Federal judicial service

Harvey received a recess appointment from President Andrew Jackson on November 2, 1830, to a seat on the United States District Court for the District of New Hampshire vacated by Judge John S. Sherburne. He was nominated to the same position by President Jackson on December 14, 1830. He was confirmed by the United States Senate on December 16, 1830, and received his commission the same day. His service terminated on April 7, 1866, due to his death in Concord, New Hampshire. He was interred in Old North Cemetery in Concord.

Family

Harvey was the son of Matthew and Hannah (Hadley) Harvey. Harvey was the brother of Jonathan Harvey, also a United States representative from New Hampshire.

References

Sources

 
 National Governors Association
 

1781 births
1866 deaths
Democratic Party governors of New Hampshire
Judges of the United States District Court for the District of New Hampshire
United States federal judges appointed by Andrew Jackson
19th-century American judges
Dartmouth College alumni
Members of the Executive Council of New Hampshire
Speakers of the New Hampshire House of Representatives
Democratic Party members of the New Hampshire House of Representatives
Democratic Party New Hampshire state senators
Presidents of the New Hampshire Senate
People from Sutton, New Hampshire
Democratic-Republican Party members of the United States House of Representatives from New Hampshire
People from Hopkinton, New Hampshire
19th-century American politicians
Burials in New Hampshire
United States federal judges admitted to the practice of law by reading law